Nakatsuka (written: 中塚) is a Japanese surname. Notable people with the surname include:

, Japanese video game composer
, Japanese politician

Japanese-language surnames